Serhiy Mykolayovych Kaplin, born on December 15, 1979, is a Ukrainian politician. He is a People's Deputy of Ukraine of the VIIth and VIIIth convocations, and the leader of the Social Democratic Party. In the Ukrainian Parliamentary, he was a member of the faction of the Petro Poroshenko Bloc.

Kaplin was an unsuccessful candidate for President of Ukraine in the 2019 election.

Biography
On October 2, 2017 Kaplin was elected party leader of the Socialist Party of Ukraine during a congress and he simultaneously stated his intention to take part of the 2019  presidential election. On  January 27, 2018, during the "joint meeting of the political council and the central control commission of the Socialist Party of Ukraine" Illia Kyva was expelled from the ranks of the Socialist Party of Ukraine and deprived of the status of the head of this political force. Kyva claimed that his exclusion from the SPU was illegitimate. Meanwhile according to the legal registration of the Socialist Party Kyva was the legal chairman of this party. Kyva was nominated by the Socialist Party on November 3, 2018 for President of Ukraine in the 2019 election.

According to a 2018 survey (of all Ukrainian politicians) by the "Committee of Voters of Ukraine" most of Kaplin's election promises cannot be fulfilled even theoretically.

In the 2019 Ukrainian parliamentary election Kaplin lost reelection as an independent candidate in single-seat constituency 144 (Poltava Oblast).

References

External links
Dovidka 
Social Democratic Party

1979 births
Living people
People from Poltava Oblast
Seventh convocation members of the Verkhovna Rada
Eighth convocation members of the Verkhovna Rada
Ukrainian Democratic Alliance for Reform politicians
Independent politicians of Petro Poroshenko Bloc
Socialist Party of Ukraine politicians
People of the Orange Revolution
Candidates in the 2019 Ukrainian presidential election